List of Congolese people may refer to:

List of people from the Democratic Republic of the Congo
List of people from the Republic of the Congo